Maximilian "Maxi" Thiel (born 3 February 1993) is a German professional footballer who plays as a midfielder or winger for 3. Liga club Erzgebirge Aue.

Club career

Wacker Burghausen
A product of the Wacker Burghausen youth academy, Thiel made his professional debut in August 2010 at the age of 17 in the 3. Liga against Rot Weiss Ahlen under coach Mario Basler. In October of the same year he signed his first professional contract. In the following years he developed into a regular then a key player and eventually into one of the most sought-after talents of the 3. Liga. He made a total 76 appearances for the club.

1. FC Köln
At the start of the 2013–14 season Thiel moved to then 2. Bundesliga team 1. FC Köln and at the end of the season the club won the league championship and got promoted to the Bundesliga.

Union Berlin
During the summer transfer window in 2014 he moved to Union Berlin on loan. Thiel established himself in the starting line-up instantly and evolved into a key player. After a successful one-year loan deal, Union Berlin signed him on a two-year contract until 2017. In October 2015, he was appointed as vice-captain and made a member of the team committee.

In February 2016, he sustained an injury which kept him out of action for a long time. In his time at the club, he played 33 matches scoring 7 goals and assisting 7 times.

1. FC Heidenheim
In May 2017, Thiel's signing of a two-year contract was announced by league rivals 1. FC Heidenheim.

SV Wehen Wiesbaden
In July 2021, Thiel was signed by 3. Liga side SV Wehen Wiesbaden on a one-year-deal.

International career
Thiel has been capped for Germany national under-20 team nine teams, scoring four goals.

Style of play
At the beginning of his career Thiel played more as a central midfielder, before switching onto the wing where he now plays as a left winger. Besides his good technique and pace, the left-footed attacker is known for his powerful shot.

References

External links

1993 births
Living people
People from Altötting
Sportspeople from Upper Bavaria
Association football midfielders
German footballers
Germany youth international footballers
3. Liga players
2. Bundesliga players
SV Wacker Burghausen players
1. FC Köln players
1. FC Köln II players
1. FC Union Berlin players
1. FC Heidenheim players
SV Wehen Wiesbaden players
FC Erzgebirge Aue players
Footballers from Bavaria